This article is about the demographic features of the population of the Republic of the Congo, including population density, ethnicity, education level, health of the populace, economic status,  religious affiliations and other aspects of the population.

The Republic of the Congo's sparse population is concentrated in the southwestern portion of the country, leaving the vast areas of tropical jungle in the north virtually uninhabited. Thus, Congo is one of the most urbanized countries in Africa, with 85% of its total population living in a few urban areas, namely in Brazzaville, Pointe-Noire, or one of the small cities or villages lining the  railway which connects the two cities. In rural areas, industrial and commercial activity has declined rapidly in recent years, leaving rural economies dependent on the government for support and subsistence. Before the 1997 war, about 15,000 Europeans and other non-Africans lived in Congo, most of whom were French. Presently, only about 9,500 remain. Pygmies make up 2% of Congo's population.

Population
 
The proportion of children below the age of 15 in 2010 was 40.6%, 55.7% was between 15 and 65 years of age, while 3.7% was 65 years or older
.

Population Estimates by Sex and Age Group (01.VII.2009): 

Population Estimates by Sex and Age Group (01.VII.2020):

Vital statistics
Registration of vital events in the Republic of the Congo is incomplete. The Population Departement of the United Nations prepared the following estimates.

Source: UN DESA, World Population Prospects, 2022

Fertility and Births
Total Fertility Rate (TFR) (Wanted Fertility Rate) and Crude Birth Rate (CBR):

Fertility data as of 2011-2012 (DHS Program):

Ethnic groups
Kongo 40.5%, Teke 16.9%, Mbochi 13.1%, Sangha 5.6%, Europeans and other 23.9%

Languages

French (official), Kituba or Monokutuba (lingua franca), Kongo or Kikongo, Lingala, and many local languages and dialects.

The majority of the population is concentrated along the railroad between Pointe-Noire and Brazzaville in the south where Kituba (a creole language based on Kikongo) is the primary language. Lingala is influential in the sparsely inhabited northern half of the country.

Religion
Roman Catholic 33.1%, Awakening Churches/Christian Revival 22.3%, Protestant 19.9%, Salutiste 2.2%, Islam 1.6%, Kimbanguiste 1.5%, Other 8.1%, None 11.3% (2010 est.)

Health
Life expectancy for the population was estimated at 54.91 years in 2011: 53.62 for males and 56.25 for females. The adult prevalence rate for HIV/AIDS was 3.4% as of 2009, representing 77,000 people living with the disease and 5,100 deaths. The Republic of Congo is considered to have a high degree of risk of infectious diseases, particularly bacterial diarrhea, hepatitis A and typhoid fever (all food- or waterborne), and malaria (vectorborne).

Education
As of 2003, 83.8% of the adult population was considered literate, consisting 89.3% of males and 78.4% of females.

Other demographic statistics
Demographic statistics according to the World Population Review in 2022.

One birth every 3 minutes	
One death every 14 minutes	
One net migrant every 206 minutes	
Net gain of one person every 4 minutes

The following demographic statistics are from the CIA World Factbook.

Population
5,546,307 (2022 est.)
5,062,021 (July 2018 est.)

Religions
Roman Catholic 33.1%, Awakening Churches/Christian Revival 22.3%, Protestant 19.9%, Salutiste 2.2%, Muslim 1.6%, Kimbanguiste 1.5%, other 8.1%, none 11.3% (2007 est.)

Age structure

0-14 years: 41.57% (male 1,110,484/female 1,089,732)
15-24 years: 17.14% (male 454,981/female 452,204)
25-54 years: 33.5% (male 886,743/female 886,312)
55-64 years: 4.59% (male 125,207/female 117,810)
65 years and over: 3.2% (male 75,921/female 93,676) (2020 est.)

0-14 years: 41.75% (male 1,066,474 /female 1,046,924)
15-24 years: 16.99% (male 431,279 /female 428,999)
25-54 years: 33.77% (male 857,596 /female 851,712)
55-64 years: 4.39% (male 112,669 /female 109,429)
65 years and over: 3.1% (male 69,621 /female 87,318) (2018 est.)

0-14 years: 41.67% (male 1,041,761/female 1,022,763)
15-24 years: 17.1% (male 424,521/female 422,755)
25-54 years: 33.89% (male 843,856/female 835,041)
55-64 years: 4.29% (male 106,776/female 105,573)
65 years and over: 3.06% (male 66,962/female 84,666) (2017 est.)

Median age
total: 19.5 years. Country comparison to the world: 202nd
male: 19.3 years
female: 19.7 years (2020 est.)

total: 19.6 years. Country comparison to the world: 199th
male: 19.4 years 
female: 19.8 years (2018 est.)

total: 19.7 years
male: 19.5 years
female: 19.8 years (2017 est.)

Birth rate
31.82 births/1,000 population (2022 est.) Country comparison to the world: 26th
33.7 births/1,000 population (2018 est.) Country comparison to the world: 26th
34.4 births/1,000 population (2017 est.)

Death rate
8.38 deaths/1,000 population (2022 est.) Country comparison to the world: 76th
9.2 deaths/1,000 population (2018 est.) Country comparison to the world: 58th
9.5 deaths/1,000 population (2017 est.)

Total fertility rate
4.36 children born/woman (2022 est.) Country comparison to the world: 21st
4.26 children born/woman (2018 est.) Country comparison to the world: 28th

Population growth rate
2.34% (2022 est.) Country comparison to the world: 30th
2.17% (2018 est.) Country comparison to the world: 38th
2.11% (2017 est.)

Mother's mean age at first birth
19.8 years (2011/12 est.)
note: median age at first birth among women 25-29

Contraceptive prevalence rate
30.1% (2014/15)

Net migration rate
-2.8 migrant(s)/1,000 population (2018 est.) Country comparison to the world: 172nd

Religions
Roman Catholic 33.1%, Awakening Churches/Christian Revival 22.3%, Protestant 19.9%, Salutiste 2.2%, Muslim 1.6%, Kimbanguiste 1.5%, other 8.1%, none 11.3% (2010 est.)

Dependency ratios
total dependency ratio: 84.5 (2015 est.)
youth dependency ratio: 78.3 (2015 est.)
elderly dependency ratio: 6.2 (2015 est.)
potential support ratio: 16.1 (2015 est.)

Urbanization
urban population: 68.7% of total population (2022)
rate of urbanization: 3.19% annual rate of change (2020-25 est.)

urban population: 66.9% of total population (2018)
rate of urbanisation: 3.28% annual rate of change (2015-20 est.)

Sex ratio
at birth: 1.02 male(s)/female
0-14 years: 1.02 male(s)/female
15-24 years: 1 male(s)/female
25-54 years: 1.01 male(s)/female
55-64 years: 0.99 male(s)/female
65 years and over: 0.78 male(s)/female 
total population: 1.01 male(s)/female (2017 est.)

Infant mortality rate

total: 53.5 deaths/1,000 live births (2018 est.)
male: 58.3 deaths/1,000 live births (2018 est.)
female: 48.5 deaths/1,000 live births (2018 est.)

Life expectancy at birth
total population: 62.1 years. Country comparison to the world: 215th
male: 60.65 years
female: 63.61 years (2022 est.)

total population: 60.3 years (2018 est.)
male: 59 years (2018 est.)
female: 61.6 years (2018 est.)

HIV/AIDS
 Adult prevalence rate: 3.1% (2017 est.)
 People living with HIV/AIDS: 100,000 (2017 est.)
 HIV/AIDS deaths: 4,900 (2017 est.)

Obesity - adult prevalence rate

 9.6% (2016)

Children under the age of 5 years underweight

 12.3% (2015)

Literacy
definition: age 15 and over can read and write
total population: 80.3%
male: 86.1%
female: 74.6% (2018)

definition: age 15 and over can read and write (2015 est.)
total population: 79.3% (2015 est.)
male: 86.4% (2015 est.)
female: 72.9% (2015 est.)

School life expectancy (primary to tertiary education)
total: 11 years (2012)
male: 11 years (2012)
female: 11 years (2012)

Major infectious diseases
degree of risk: very high (2020)
food or waterborne diseases: bacterial and protozoal diarrhea, hepatitis A, and typhoid fever
vectorborne diseases: malaria and dengue fever
water contact diseases: schistosomiasis
animal contact diseases: rabies

note: on 21 March 2022, the US Centers for Disease Control and Prevention (CDC) issued a Travel Alert for polio in Africa; the Republic of the Congo is currently considered a high risk to travelers for circulating vaccine-derived polioviruses (cVDPV); vaccine-derived poliovirus (VDPV) is a strain of the weakened poliovirus that was initially included in oral polio vaccine (OPV) and that has changed over time and behaves more like the wild or naturally occurring virus; this means it can be spread more easily to people who are unvaccinated against polio and who come in contact with the stool or respiratory secretions, such as from a sneeze, of an “infected” person who received oral polio vaccine; the CDC recommends that before any international travel, anyone unvaccinated, incompletely vaccinated, or with an unknown polio vaccination status should complete the routine polio vaccine series; before travel to any high-risk destination, CDC recommends that adults who previously completed the full, routine polio vaccine series receive a single, lifetime booster dose of polio vaccine

References

 
Society of the Republic of the Congo